Albert Orlando Boschen (June 25, 1873 – August 15, 1957) was an American politician who served in the Virginia House of Delegates.

Born in Richmond, Virginia, Boschen was educated at Benedictine High School and the University of Richmond. After working in his father's shoe business, he enrolled in the T. C. Williams School of Law, after which he began a law practice in 1898. He first ventured into politics in 1900 as a member of the Democratic Committee in Richmond.

Boschen acted with a stock theater company and in amateur dramatic productions. He also directed the Virginia Historical Pageant and Samis Grotto.

References

External links 

1873 births
1957 deaths
Democratic Party members of the Virginia House of Delegates
20th-century American politicians
University of Richmond alumni
Politicians from Richmond, Virginia